The Quaker Farms Historic District is a historic district in the town of Oxford, Connecticut, United States.  It encompasses a small rural village on Quaker Farms Road (Connecticut Route 188) anchored by the Christ Church Episcopal, an 1812 wood-frame church with Federal and Gothic styling, located at 470 Quaker Farms Road.  The district also includes eleven houses, built between the mid-18th and mid-19th centuries.  The oldest houses date to the 1720s, and the church has a particularly well-preserved early 19th-century interior, albeit with some alterations.  One house was built about 1800 as a carriage manufactory.  The district was listed on the National Register of Historic Places in 1991.

The name "Quaker Farms" was in use in the 18th century, but its origin is not known. Oxford was incorporated in the late 18th century, and the Quaker Farms area had grown sufficiently by the 1810s to warrant an Episcopal parish separate from that at the town center. This period of growth is reflected in the surviving architecture of the village, which mostly predates 1850. There is a single instance of Victorian Queen Anne architecture, at 489 Quaker Farms Road. A small number of Colonial Revival houses were built in the village in the early 20th century.

See also

National Register of Historic Places listings in New Haven County, Connecticut

References

Historic districts in New Haven County, Connecticut
Federal architecture in Connecticut
Colonial Revival architecture in Connecticut
Oxford, Connecticut
National Register of Historic Places in New Haven County, Connecticut
Historic districts on the National Register of Historic Places in Connecticut